The 2016 New Hampshire Democratic presidential primary was held on Tuesday February 9. As per tradition, it was the first primary and second nominating contest overall to take place in the cycle. Bernie Sanders defeated Hillary Clinton in the primary by a margin of more than 22% in the popular vote. Sanders claimed 15 delegates to Clinton's 9.

It occurred on the same day as the Republican primary.

Debates and forums

December 2015 debate in Goffstown

On December 19, 2015, the Democratic Party held their third debate at St. Anselm College in Goffstown, New Hampshire. Hosted by "World News Tonight" anchor David Muir and Chief Global Affairs Correspondent Martha Raddatz, it aired on ABC News. Ahead of the debate, WMUR-TV's co-sponsorship had been revoked by the DNC due to a labor dispute. Participants were Hillary Clinton, Bernie Sanders, and Martin O'Malley.

The topics covered during the debate included Sanders' campaign's breach of Clinton's campaign data, strategy for defeating ISIS, gun control, the issue of whether to depose President Assad of Syria, if Wall Street favored each candidate, stability in the Middle East enforced by dictators and whether regime change was necessary, and the role of the First Spouse.

February 2016 forum in Derry
A fifth forum, a Town Hall event, was held on February 3, 2016, in Derry, New Hampshire. It aired on CNN.

Lesser known candidates forum at Goffstown
One of the highlights of the campaign is when the non-recognized candidates gather together to introduce themselves to the public at this event, which first was held in 1972.

Due to the notorious glitter-bombing incident of the previous cycle, Vermin Supreme was pointedly dis-invited, but showed up anyway, and made the national news. Eighteen people showed up: Jon Adams, Eric Elbot, Rocky De La Fuente, Mark Greenstein, Henry Hewes, William McGaughey, Edward O'Donnell, Graham Schwass, Sam Sloan, Edward Sonnino, Michael Steinberg, and several others.

February 2016 debate in Durham

Unlike in previous years, initially, only a single authorized debate was scheduled to be held in New Hampshire. Initially planned as an unsanctioned debate, a debate on February 4 in Durham, New Hampshire was however later confirmed by the DNC. Hosted by Chuck Todd and Rachel Maddow, it was broadcast by NBC News. While Hillary Clinton, Bernie Sanders, and Martin O'Malley all confirmed their participation, O'Malley eventually came to suspend his campaign prior to the debate.

Commentators of the debate cited the elevated discourse between the candidates. There was discussion on the death penalty (federal versus state), money in politics, and assessing Iran, North Korea and Russia as threats to national security. Clinton demanded that Sanders explain his "artful smears" of Clinton receiving campaign donations. Sanders responded by critiquing the inherently "quid-pro-quo" nature of Wall Street campaign donations. The exchange between the two candidates was called by Eric Levitz one of the best 10-minute exchanges in the history of American political debates.

Candidates

This is a list of the candidates on the ballot in the New Hampshire primary.

The following notable candidates had participated in all authorized debates:
 Hillary Clinton of New York (campaign), United States Secretary of State (2009–2013), presidential candidate in 2008, United States Senator from New York (2001–2009), First Lady of the United States (1993–2001)
 Bernie Sanders of Vermont (campaign), United States Senator from Vermont (2007–present), United States Representative from Vermont (1991–2007), Mayor of Burlington (1981–1989)
 Martin O'Malley of Maryland (campaign), Governor of Maryland (2007–2015), Mayor of Baltimore (1999–2007). By this time, O'Malley had withdrawn from the race.

The following candidates have not been invited to any major debates or listed in national polls, but were notable enough to have Wikipedia articles written about them:
 Rocky De La Fuente of California, businessman
 Keith Russell Judd of Texas, perennial candidate
 Sam Sloan of New York, former chess administrator and 2012 Libertarian Party candidate
 Vermin Supreme of Massachusetts, performance artist and perennial candidate
 John Wolfe, Jr. of Tennessee, attorney, Democratic Party nominee for U.S. House of Representatives for Tennessee's 3rd congressional district, 2002, 2004, 2010

In addition to appearing on the New Hampshire primary ballot, the following candidates were on the primary ballot in one or more other state(s):
 Steve Burke, former St. Lawrence County Democratic Committee Chair
 Henry Hewes
 Michael Steinberg, lawyer, candidate U.S. House of Representatives 2006
 Star Locke of Texas, rancher
 James Valentine of Virginia, political philosopher

The following were not listed on the primary ballot in any state(s) other than New Hampshire:
 Jon Adams of New York
 Eric Elbot of Massachusetts
 Bill French of Pennsylvania
 Mark Stewart Greenstein of Connecticut
 Brock C. Hutton of Maryland
 Lloyd Kelso of North Carolina
 Steven Roy Lipscomb of New Mexico
 Robert Lovitt of Kentucky
 William H. McGaughey, Jr. of Minnesota
 Raymond Michael Moroz of New York
 Edward T. O'Donnell, Jr.
 Edward Sonnino
 Graham Schwass
 David John Thistle of New Hampshire
 Richard Lyons Weil of Colorado

Opinion polling

Results

Results by county
Sanders won every county.

Analysis
Sanders scored a landslide 22-point routing in the New Hampshire primary, thanks to what The New York Times described as a "harness [of] working-class fury" against the so-called "establishment" candidates like Hillary Clinton, in a state known for its rebellious electorate. Sanders' win was propelled by younger voters, whom he won 74–25, men whom he won 67–32, self-identified Independents whom he won 73–25, and white voters whom he won 61-37 and who comprised 91% of the Democratic electorate in the Granite State. According to exit polls, a 53-45 majority of voters thought Clinton was not honest or trustworthy, while 89% said Sanders was honest. 61% of voters said they were dissatisfied or angry about the federal government. Sanders swept all income levels and educational attainment levels in the Granite State, except those who made more than $200k per year.

Sanders swept all of the major cities, including Nashua, Dover, Concord, and Manchester. Sanders won along the seacoast 59–41, in the Manchester/Nashua area 54–44, in Concord/Ct. Valley 64–35, in the south 59–39, and in the north 65–33. Clinton only won three towns: Bedford, Millsfield, and Windham.

Sanders' landslide victory was a clear regression for Clinton from 2008, when she had narrowly beaten Barack Obama in the 2008 New Hampshire primary thanks to support from populous southern New Hampshire. Both Sanders' percentage of the vote and margin of victory are the largest in a Democratic New Hampshire primary since John F. Kennedy in 1960.

See also
 2016 New Hampshire Republican presidential primary

References
Notes

Citations

New Hampshire
Democratic primary
2016